Tibor Viniczai (6 September 1956 – 27 December 2022) was a Hungarian agricultural engineer and politician, who served as Mayor of Székesfehérvár in 2010.

Viniczai was a founding member of the Hungarian Democratic Forum (MDF) in 1988. He was appointed mayor of his hometown in July 2010, after his predecessor, Tihamér Warvasovszky resigned when he became Vice President of the State Audit Office of Hungary.

Viniczai died on 27 December 2022, at the age of 66.

References

1956 births
2022 deaths
Hungarian Democratic Forum politicians
Mayors of places in Hungary
People from Székesfehérvár